The following lists events that happened in 2009 in Libya.

Incumbents
President: Muammar al-Gaddafi 
Prime Minister: Baghdadi Mahmudi 

 
Years of the 21st century in Libya
Libya
Libya
2000s in Libya